Keralodayam Mahakavyam: A Mahakavya in Sanskrit based on the history of Kerala is an epic poem in Sanskrit written by K. N. Ezhuthachan, a scholar in Malayalam from Kerala, India. The poem contains nearly 2500 verses and deals with the entire history of Kerala from its origin up to the formation of the state of Kerala, covering a period of 2000 years.
The work received the Sahitya Akademi award in the year 1979.

Contents
Keralodayam Mahakavyam composed of 21 sargas contains nearly 2500 verses and deals with the entire history of Kerala from its origin up to the formation of the state of Kerala. The work is divided into five sections called Manjari’s namely Swapna, Smriti, Aithihya, Bodha, Charithra.

Swapna Manjari

This part deals with the legend of Parashurama, Retrieving the land of Kerala from the ocean.

Smruti Manjari

This part contains the history of Sangam period and the rule of Chera Kings.

Aithihya Manjari

Descriptions about the Occupation of Aryans in Kerala and myths associated with it.

Bodha Manjari

The history of the Zamorins as they gain power and formation of their rule in Malabar.

Charithra Manjari

Deals with incidents from the time of the arrival of Portuguese people in Malabar and the ensuing social changes, to the time of the formation of the state of Kerala. There are also descriptions about the conflicts of native kings and Europeans. This section contains detailed descriptions of the Indian independence movement as well.

References

Further reading
Keralodayam Mahakavyam
DEPICTION OF FREEDOM MOVEMENT IN SANSKRIT WORKS OF KERALA AUTHORS 
HISTORICAL DETAILS FROM MAHAKAVYAS

1977 books
Sanskrit texts
Epic poems in Sanskrit